Wilfrid Philip Shepherd-Barron, MC, TD, LlD (1888–1979) was a British civil engineer and army officer.

Early life
Shepherd-Barron was born Wilfrid Barron in Wick, Caithness, Scotland in 1888. Shepherd-Barron served in the Royal Engineers and received the Military Cross, he was also awarded the Territorial Decoration. After his service with the Royal Engineers he served in the voluntary, unpaid Engineer and Railway Staff Corps which provides technical expertise to the British Army.  On 17 December 1946 he was promoted to Lieutenant-Colonel of that corps. He was promoted to Colonel in the corps on 24 February 1950 and retired from the corps on 3 January 1956, receiving permission to retain his rank. Shepherd-Barron was awarded an honorary degree of Doctor of Laws by Aberdeen University. He served as president of the Institution of Civil Engineers from November 1953 to November 1954.

Personal life
He married tennis player Dorothy Shepherd. Their son, John Shepherd-Barron became the inventor who pioneered the development of the Automated Teller Machine (ATM).

References

Bibliography 

        
        
        
        
        
        

Scottish civil engineers
British civil engineers
1888 births
1979 deaths
Presidents of the Institution of Civil Engineers
Engineer and Railway Staff Corps officers
Recipients of the Military Cross
Royal Engineers officers
British Army personnel of World War I